Dorrego is a station on Line B of the Buenos Aires Underground. The station was opened on 17 October 1930 as part of the inaugural section of the line between Federico Lacroze and Callao.

It is located at the intersection of Avenida Corrientes and Avenida Dorrego, and named after the latter. One of the corners of the Parque de los Andes is also located at that intersection. The station connects with Villa Crespo Station of the San Martín Line commuter rail service, as well as Metrobus Juan B. Justo.

Gallery

References

External links

Buenos Aires Underground stations
Railway stations opened in 1930
1930 establishments in Argentina